"Speak to Me Pretty" is a song written by By Dunham and Henry Vars and performed by Brenda Lee.  The song featured on Lee's 1961 album, All the Way. Not chosen to be a single in the United States, the song was selected by Lee's U.K. record label as a single and reached No.3 in the U.K. singles chart in May 1962, which made it the highest-placing chart single Lee ever had in the U.K. The single also made No.57 on the overall U.K. sales chart for 1962. "Speak to Me Pretty" reached No.8 in the Norwegian charts in 1962 also.

Other versions
Bobby Stevens released a version in 1962 as the B-side to the single "Never Goodbye".
Victor Silvester and His Ballroom Orchestra released a version as a single in 1962 as the B-side to the single "When My Little Girl is Smiling".
Lena Zavaroni released a version on her 1977 album, Presenting Lena Zavaroni.

In media
Lee's version was featured in the 1961 film, Two Little Bears.

References

1962 songs
1962 singles
Brenda Lee songs
Brunswick Records singles
Columbia Records singles
Songs written for films